Year 910 (CMX) was a common year starting on Monday (link will display the full calendar) of the Julian calendar.


Events

By place

Europe 
 June 12 – Battle of Augsburg: The Hungarians defeat the East Frankish army under King Louis IV (the Child), using the famous feigned retreat tactic of the nomadic warriors. Count Gausbert, the actual commander of the East Frankish army (because Louis IV is only 16 years old at this time), is killed in the battle.
 June 22 – Battle of Rednitz: The Hungarians defeat the East Frankish army near the Rednitz River, killing its leader Gebhard, Duke of Lotharingia (Lorraine). After the battle Louis IV, together with the East Frankish duchies Franconia, Lotharingia, Bavaria and Saxony, agrees to pay tribute to the Hungarian state. 
 Summer – King Alfonso III of Asturias is forced to abdicate the throne and partitions the kingdom among his three sons. The eldest son, García I, becomes king of León. The second son, Ordoño II, reigns in Galicia, while the third, Fruela II, receives Asturias with Oviedo as his capital.

Britain 
 August 5 – Battle of Tettenhall: King Edward the Elder attacks the joint-Kings Eowils and Halfdan of Norse York. All three Viking monarchs are killed in battle (one chronicle mentions a third brother) and the Viking army is decisively defeated by allied forces of Mercia and Wessex. The co-Kings are succeeded by Ragnall ua Ímair.

By topic

Religion 
 William I (the Pious) of Aquitaine, donates land in Burgundy for the building of a Benedictine monastery dedicated to the saints Peter and Paul. Hence the Abbey of Cluny, becomes the largest in the West. In the foundation charter, William renounces all rights to the monastery and nominates Berno as the first abbot of Cluny (Eastern France). He places the monastery directly under the control of the Papal See.
 Gabriel I becomes Pope of the Coptic Orthodox Church in Alexandria (Egypt).

Births 
 Adalbert, archbishop of Magdeburg (approximate date)
 Eadgyth, Anglo-Saxon princess and queen of Germany (d. 946)
 Fernán González, count of Castile (approximate date)
 Fujiwara no Asatada, Japanese nobleman (d. 966)
 Gamle Eirikssen, Norwegian Viking ruler (d. 955)
 Gunnhild, Norwegian Viking queen (approximate date)
 Hedwig of Saxony, Frankish noblewoman and regent (d. 965)
 Helena Lekapene, Byzantine empress (approximate date)
 Herbert III, Frankish nobleman (approximate date)
 John XI, pope of the Catholic Church (d. 935)
 Ma Yize, Muslim astronomer (approximate date)
 Minamoto no Saneakira, Japanese nobleman (d. 970)
 Nilus the Younger, Byzantine abbot (d. 1005)
 Oda of Metz, German noblewoman (d. 963)
 Sahl ben Matzliah, Jewish philosopher (d. 990)
 Yan Xu, Chinese chancellor (d. 967)

Deaths 
 January 26 – Luo Yin, Chinese statesman and poet
 June 2 – Richilde of Provence, Frankish empress
 June 22
 Gebhard, Frankish nobleman
 Gerhard I, Frankish nobleman 
 July 4 – Luo Shaowei, Chinese warlord (b. 877)
 July 31 – Feng Xingxi, Chinese warlord
 August 5 
 Eowils and Halfdan, kings of Northumbria
 Ingwær, king of Northumbria
 December 20 – Alfonso III, king of Asturias
 December 23 – Naum of Preslav, Bulgarian writer
 Adelin, bishop of Séez (approximate date)
 Andronikos Doukas, Byzantine general (approximate date)
 Atenulf I (the Great), Lombard prince
 Eustathios Argyros, Byzantine general
 Isa al-Nushari, Abbasid governor
 Ishaq ibn Hunayn, Abbasid physician (or 911)
 Junayd Baghdadi, Persian Sufi mystic (b. 835)
 Liu Shouwen, Chinese warlord and governor 
 Lu Guangchou, Chinese warlord
 Mahendrapala I, king of Gurjara-Pratihara (India)
 Muhammad ibn Tahir, Abbasid governor 
 Muncimir, duke (knyaz) of Croatia
 Sosei, Japanese waka poet (b. 844)
 Wei Zhuang, Chinese poet (b. 836)
 Yasovarman I, ruler of the Angkor Empire

References